USS Martin may refer to the following ships of the United States Navy:

 , a screw tug purchased by the US Navy 16 June 1864 and decommissioned in June 1865
 , launched 18 May 1943 and sold for scrapping 15 May 1946
 , an Edsall-class destroyer escort

United States Navy ship names